The 1990–91 Japan Ice Hockey League season was the 25th season of the Japan Ice Hockey League. Six teams participated in the league, and the Oji Seishi Hockey won the championship.

Regular season

Final
 Oji Seishi Hockey - Kokudo Keikaku 3:2 (4:2, 4:5, 2:4, 2:1 n.V., 4:3)

External links
 Japan Ice Hockey Federation

Japan
Ice Hock
Japan Ice Hockey League seasons
Japan